Scymnus nemorivagus, is a species of beetle found in the family Coccinellidae. It is found in North America.

References 

Beetles of North America
Insects described in 1952